Haackgreerius is a genus of skink, a lizard in the family Scincidae. The genus contains one species.

Etymology
The generic name, Haackgreerius, is in honor of South African herpetologist Wulf Dietrich Haacke and Australian herpetologist Allen E. Greer.

Geographic range
The genus Haackgreerius is endemic to coastal Somalia.

Species
The genus Haackgreerius is monotypic, containing a single species, Haackgreerius miopus.

Habitat
The preferred natural habitat of H. miopus is shrubland.

Description
The eye of H. miopus is vestigial and is covered by an undifferentiated ocular scale. The front legs are absent, but hind legs are present. Each hind foot has only two toes.

Reproduction
The mode of reproduction of H. miopus is unknown.

References

Further reading
Greer AE, Haacke WD (1982). "A new and unusual species of Lygosoma (Lacertilia: Scincidae) from the Horn of Africa". Annals of the Transvaal Museum 33 (10): 153–164. (Lygosoma miopus, new species).
Lanza B (1983). "A List of the Somali Amphibians and Reptiles". Monitore Zoologico Italiano. Supplemento 18 (1): 193–247. (Haackgreerius, new genus, p. 210; H. miopus, new combination, p. 210). (in English, with an abstract in Italian).
Lanza B (1990). "Amphibians and reptiles of the Somali Democratic Republic: check list and biogeography". Biogeographia 14: 407–465. (Genus Haackgreerius, p. 423; species H. miopus, p. 423).

Endemic fauna of Somalia
Skinks
Lizard genera
Taxa named by Allen Eddy Greer
Taxa named by Wulf Dietrich Haacke
Hobyo grasslands and shrublands